Gofraidh Fionn Ó Dálaigh (died 1387), of Duhallow, Country Cork,  was an Irish poet and Chief Ollamh of Ireland.

He is known to be one of the most important professional poets of fourteen-century Ireland.

Biography

Gofraidh Fionn (Geoffrey the Fair) was a member of the Ó Dálaigh family of poets. He is known for his poem, Filidh Éireann go haointeach, which commemorates An Nollaig na Garma. This convention of poets and men of learning was held by Uilliam Buidhe Ó Ceallaigh of Uí Maine at his castle in County Roscommon during Christmas of 1351.

His obituary is given in the Annals of the Four Masters as follows- "M1387.4 Godfrey Finn O'Daly, Chief Poet of Ireland died."

Selected bibliography
 Bean Torrach, fa Tuar Broide
 Mairg mheallas muirn an tsaoghail
 A chnuic thoir re taoibh Ealla
 A chros thall ar an dtulaigh
 A fhir théid i dTír Chonaill
 A Ghearóid, déana mo dháil
 Beir eolas dúinn, a Dhomhnuill
 Do tógbhadh meirge Murchaidh
 Fa ngníomhraidh measdar meic ríogh
 Fuirigh go fóill, a Éire
 Gaois Ailbhe i n-inghin Domhnuill
 Iongaibh thú orm, a Iarla
 Maith an locht airdríogh óige
 Teach carad do-chiu folamh

Note

External links
 L. Mac Kenna, A Poem by Gofraidh Fionn Ó Dálaigh, JSTOR.
 Selected Poems
  To a Harp 
 

1387 deaths
14th-century Irish writers
14th-century Irish poets
Year of birth unknown
Irish male poets